Joseph-Bernard Rosier (18 October 1804 – 12 October 1880) was a 19th-century French playwright and librettist.

Biography 
He first worked as a solicitor's clerk before becoming a professor of rhetoric  and embarking on a literary career in 1830.

His plays were presented on the most significant Parisian stages of the nineteenth century, including those of the Théâtre du Vaudeville, Théâtre des Variétés, Théâtre de la Porte-Saint-Martin, and Théâtre français.

Works 

1830: Le Mendiant Cratès, ou le Rêve et le réveil
1830: Le mari de ma femme, comedy in 3 acts
1831: Raymond, ou Le secret de la reine, opéra comique in 3 acts, with Adolphe de Leuven
1831: Le Mariage par dévouement, comedy in 3 acts, in verses
1833: La Mort de Figaro, drama in 5 acts, in prose
1834: Charles IX, drama in 5 acts
1834: La jolie voyageuse ou Les deux Giroux, anecdote contemporaine in 1 act, with Achille d'Artois and René de Chazet
1836: Un procès criminel, ou les Femmes impressionnables, comedy in 3 acts
1836: Vieilles et nouvelles histoires
1837: Maria Padilla, Spanish chronicle in 3 acts, one prologue and one epilogue
1837: Claire, ou la Préférence d'une mère, drama in 3 acts, in prose
1838: Les assurances conjugales, comedy in 1 act, mingled with chant
1838: A trente ans ou Une femme raisonnable, comedy in 3 acts mingled with couplets, with Alexandre Pierre Joseph Doche
1839: L'Amour, comedy in 3 acts
1839: La Lune rousse, comedy in 1 act, mingled with songs
1839: Le protégé, comedy in 1 act
1839: Le manoir de Montlouvier, drama in 5 acts
1840: La Femme de mon mari, comedy in 2 acts, mingled with couplets
1840: La mansarde du crime, comedy en 1 act
1841: Zacharie, drama in 5 acts
1841: Langeli, comedy in 1 act, mingled with couplets
1841: Manche à manche, comedy in 1 act, mingled with song
1842: Les deux brigadiers, vaudeville in 2 acts
1842: Monsieur de Maugaillard, ou le Premier jour des noces, comedy in 1 act in prose
1846: L'Inconsolable ou Les Deux déménagements, comédie-vaudeville in 3 acts
1847: Un mousquetaire-gris, comedy mingled with couplets in 2 acts
1848: Le pouvoir d'une femme, comedy in 2 acts
1848: La Dernière conquête, comedy mingled with song, in 2 acts
1849: Brutus, lâche César !, comedy in 1 act mingled with song
1849: La Pension alimentaire, comédie-vaudeville in 2 acts
1849: Croque poule, comédie-vaudeville en 1 act
1850: Un mariage en trois étapes, comedy mingled with song, in 3 acts
1850: Le songe d'une nuit d'été, opéra comique in 3 acts, with Ambroise Thomas and Adolphe de Leuven
1851: Deux lions râpés, comédie-vaudeville in 3 tableaux, with Charles Varin
1851: Raymond ou le Secret de la reine, opéra comique in 3 acts, with Ambroise Thomas and Adolphe de Leuven
1851: Une passion du midi, vaudeville in 1 act
1852: Un mari trop aimé, comédie-vaudeville in 1 act
1853: La foi, l'espérance et la charité, drama in 5 acts and six parts
1855: La Cour de Célimène, opéra comique in 2 acts, with Ambroise Thomas
1855: Le Housard de Berchini, opéra comique in 2 acts, with Adolphe Adam
1856: Chacun pour soi, comedy in 3 acts
undated: Un bon ouvrier, comédie-vaudeville, with Achille d'Artois

Bibliography 
 Louis Gustave Vapereau, Dictionnaire universel des contemporains, 1880,  
 Tadeusz Kowzan, Théâtre miroir: métathéâtre de l'antiquité au XXIe siècle, 2006, 
 Charles Dudley Warner, A Library of the World's Best Literature, 2008,

References 

19th-century French dramatists and playwrights
French opera librettists
People from Béziers
1804 births
1880 deaths